The following is a list of people executed by the U.S. state of Texas between 1960 and 1964. During this period 29 people were executed by electrocution at the Huntsville Unit in Texas.

Joseph Johnson became the last person in Texas to be executed by the electric chair on July 30, 1964. In addition, Lawrence O'Connor became the last person in Texas to be executed for a crime other than murder (for participating in a gang rape, on April 26, 1964). It would be 18 years before the next execution took place in Texas; all subsequent executions have been for murder.

Executions 1960–1964

See also
Capital punishment in Texas

References

External links
Death Row 1923-1973. Texas Department of Criminal Justice

1960
20th-century executions by Texas
1960s-related lists
1960s in Texas